Elections to Liverpool City Council were held on Saturday 1 November 1924.

One third of the council seats were up for election. The term of office for each councillor being three years.

A second seat was added for the Allerton ward.

Eleven of the thirty-eight seats up for election were uncontested.

As the election was held on a Saturday, the Ballot Act allowed the presiding officer to mark the ballot paper for those people who declared themselves to be of the Jewish Faith.

After the election, the composition of the council was:

Election result

Ward results

* - Councillor seeking re-election

Comparisons are made with the 1921 election results.

Abercromby

Aigburth

Allerton

Anfield

Breckfield

Brunswick

Castle Street

Childwall

Dingle

Edge Hill

Everton

Exchange

Fairfield

Fazakerley

Garston

Granby

Great George

Kensington

Kirkdale

Low Hill

Much Woolton

Netherfield

North Scotland

Old Swan

Prince's Park

Sandhills

St. Anne's

St. Domingo

St. Peter's

Sefton Park East

Sefton Park West

South Scotland

Vauxhall

Walton

Warbreck

Wavertree

Wavertree West

West Derby

Aldermanic Elections

Aldermanic Election 10 November 1924

Caused by the death of Alderman William Boote
(Conservative, last elected as an alderman on 9 November 1920) on 8 December 1923

In his place Councillor Henry Alexander Cole JP 
(Conservative, St. Peter's, elected 1 November 1922) of "The Homestead", Vyner Road, Bidston, Cheshire, was elected as an alderman by the councillors on 10 November 1924

Aldermanic Election for No. 35 Allerton 10 November 1924

Pursuant of Sub-Section (4) of Section 18 of the Liverpool Corporation Act, 1921, Councillor Henry Morley Miller (Conservative, Aigurth, elected 1 November 1922) of 2 Riverside Road, Aigburth, Liverpool, was elected as an alderman by the councillors on 10 November 1924

Aldermanic Elections 3 June 1925

Caused by the resignation of Alderman Frederick James Rawlinson (Conservative, last elected as an alderman on 9 November 1920)
 which was reported to the Council on 6 May 1925.

In whose place Councillor Albert Edward Jacob MP (Unionist, Aigburth, elected 1 November 1923) was elected as an alderman by the Council on 3 June 1925.

Caused by the death of Alderman Joseph Harrison Jones
(Liberal, elected as an alderman on 9 November 1920) on 21 November 1924.

In whose place Councillor Herber Reynolds Rathbone (Liberal, Sefton Park West, last elected 1 November 1922) on 3 June 1925

Aldermanic Election 1 July 1925

Caused by the death of alderman John Gregory Taggart (Irish Nationalist, last elected as an alderman on 9 November 1923), in whose place Councillor John Clancy (Irish Nationalist, North Scotland, elected 1 November 1922) was elected by the councillors as an alderman on 1 July 1925.

By-elections

No. 8 St. Peter's 20 November 1924

Caused by the election as an alderman of Councillor Henry Alexander Cole JP 
(Conservative, St. Peter's, elected 1 November 1922)
 on 10 November 1924, following 
the death of Alderman William Boote (Conservative, last elected as an alderman on 9 November 1920) on 8 December 1923
.

The term of office to expire on 1 November 1925.

No. 35 Aigburth, 28 November 1924

Caused by the election as an alderman of Councillor Henry Morley Miller (Conservative, Aigurth, elected 1 November 1922) on 10 November 1924

The term of office to expire on 1 November 1925.

No. 31 Fairfield, 15 December 1924

Caused by the death of Councillor James Hughes
(National Liberal, Fairfield, elected 1 November 1923) on 21 November 1924

The term of office to expire on 1 November 1926.

No. 20 Low Hill, 19 February 1925

Caused by the death of Councillor Ellis Keyser Yates
(Conservative, Low Hill, elected 1 November 1922) on 29 January 1925
.

The term of office to end on 1 November 1925.

No. 17 Aigburth, 23 June 1825

Caused by the election as an alderman of Councillor Albert Edward Jacob MP (Unionist, Aigburth, elected 1 November 1923) who was elected as an alderman by the Council on 3 June 1925, following the resignation of Alderman Frederick James Rawlinson (Conservative, last elected as an alderman on 9 November 1920) which was reported to the Council on 6 May 1925.

The term of office to end on 1 November 1926.

No. 2 North Scotland, 8 August 1925

Caused by the election by the councillors as an alderman of Councillor John Clancy (Irish Nationalist, North Scotland, elected 1 November 1922) on 1 July 1925, following the death of alderman John Gergory Taggart (Irish Nationalist, last elected as an alderman on 9 November 1923).

Mersey Tunnel Referendum 7 May 1925

The following resolution was put to a poll of the Electors on 7 May 1925 :

"That the Electors of the City of Liverpool hereby consent to the promotion of the Bill intituled 'An Act to authorise the construction of a Tunnel under the River Mersey between Liverpool and Birkenhead; and for other purposes.'"

See also

 Liverpool City Council
 Liverpool Town Council elections 1835 - 1879
 Liverpool City Council elections 1880–present
 Mayors and Lord Mayors of Liverpool 1207 to present
 History of local government in England

References

1924
1924 English local elections
1920s in Liverpool